The Glória Funicular, sometimes known as the Elevador da Glória (Glória Lift), is a funicular railway line in the civil parish of Santo António, in the municipality of Lisbon, Portugal. It connects the Pombaline downtown (at the Restauradores Square) with the Bairro Alto (Garden/ Overlook of São Pedro de Alcântara), operated by Carris.
 
The line conforms to the funicular principle, with two cars permanently attached to opposite ends of a haulage cable, which is looped over a pulley at the upper end of the track. Unusually, traction is provided by electric motors on the two cars, which are themselves powered through an overhead wire. The cable links the two cars together so that they ascend and descend simultaneously, each car acting as a counterweight for the other one.

History

In 1875, a concession authorized the Nova Companhia dos Ascensores Mecânicos de Lisboa to construct a tram along the Calçada da Glória. This concession was donated to engineer Raoul Mesnier du Ponsard in 1882.

The final lift was inaugurated on 24 October 1885, propelled by a water-powered counterweight system, and replaced with a steam-powered mechanism by 1886. The track included two cars with exterior wheels, and a central cable that was held by protective shoes. The interior was divided into two floors, with two bunks on the lower facing the interior and two on the superior back-to-back.

In 1912, the Nova Companhia dos Ascensores Mecânicos de Lisboa (NCAML) signed with the Municipal Council of Lisbon a contract that allowed them to electrify the lines. These repairs and installations occurred between 1914 and 1915, before returning to operation.

In 1926, the Nova Companhia dos Ascensores Mecânicos de Lisboa was dissolved, and the funicular became a property of the Companhia Carris. As part of the change, in 1927, a shelter was inaugurated for passengers, which was constructed along the Praça dos Restauradores, which was contested. It was demolished in 1934.

On 1 August 1995, Carris presented a proposal to classify the line as a heritage site, to which the IPPAR consultative council proposed the classification of the tram as a National Monument  on 11 March 1997. A dispatch on 9 April 1997 ordered the approval by the Minister of Culture. The DRLisboa proposed the expansion of the classification a building on Travessa do Fala-Só and rectification of the law, which was approved on 7 January 2003 by IPPAR.

Architecture
The tram system is situated in an urban area, along an axis that slopes 17.7%, that extends from the Avenida da Liberdade to the Rua de São Pedro de Alcântara, crossing a built-up area of 19th century buildings, including the Palácio Foz and the Misericórdia of Lisboa.

The funicular includes two cars that operate parallel along two axes, that descend and climb simultaneously. The trams are inclined to allow patrons to maintain a level perspective, with seats oriented longitudinally.

See also 
Ascensor da Bica
List of funicular railways

References

Notes

Sources
 
 
 
 

Ascensor Gloria
Ascensor Gloria
Ascensor Gloria
Former water-powered funicular railways converted to electricity
Metre gauge railways in Portugal
Railway lines opened in 1885
Ascensor Gloria